Betty and Mathildi Maggira also known as "The Maggira sisters"  ("Οι αδέρφες Μαγγίρα" in Greek) are two Greek television presenters, and a comedy act. They are known for hosting the Greek Eurovision Song Contest selections and also being the commentators at the Eurovision Song Contest for ERT, the Greek network broadcasting the event. They began their careers as a show duo where they impersonate other musical artists and produce musical-type shows that often include cabaret themes. The two sisters have also worked with Greek singer, Sakis Rouvas, in a successful concert series at STARZ from 2008–2009 and both have been featured as solo acts in various television shows.

Filmography
Greek Nation Final (2008)
Maggiremata (2008–Present)
Greek National Final (2009)

Concert series
The Maggiras Show (2007)
STARZ (with Sakis Rouvas) (2008–2009)

Betty Maggira

Filmography

Television

References 

Comedy duos
Comedy musicians
Greek female dancers
Greek pop singers
Greek television presenters
Greek parodists
Parody musicians
Greek women television presenters
People from Xanthi